John Mavrocordatos, born in Constantinople on 23 July 1684 and died in Bucharest on 23 February 1719, was caimacam of Moldavia (7 October 1711 – 16 November 1711) and Prince of Wallachia between 2 December 1716 and 23 February 1719. He was a member of the Mavrocordatos family.

Life 
Youngest son of Alexander Mavrocordatos, he was a faithful assistant to the political rise of his brother Nicholas Mavrocordatos. He replaced him as Grand Logothete of the Patriarchate of Constantinople and then as Grand Dragoman of the Sublime Porte from 1710 to 1717.

In 1711 with the simple title "Caimacam" he held the interregnum in Moldavia after Dimitrie Cantemir's flight and before his brother's restoration. He then replaced Nicholas Mavrocordatos on the throne of Wallachia, during his captivity in Austria, from November 1716 to February 1719.

John Mavrocordatos had married in 1709 Zaphira Guliano, daughter of Demetrius Guliano, Grand Logothete of the Patriarchate of Constantinople, with issue including :
 Alexander (1710–1738)

He is not to be confused with his nephew John (Ioannes) Mavrocordatos (1712-1747), Prince of Moldavia between 1743 and 1747

Sources

References 

1684 births
1719 deaths
Politicians from Istanbul
John
Rulers of Moldavia
Rulers of Wallachia
Dragomans of the Porte
Rulers of Moldavia and Wallachia
18th-century translators
17th-century translators
Constantinopolitan Greeks